Şəvqo is a village and municipality in the Astara Rayon of Azerbaijan. It has a population of 465.   The municipality consists of the villages of Şəvqo, Avyarud, and Diqo.

References

Populated places in Astara District